Andrea Parenti (born 26 April 1965 in Casalecchio di Reno), is an Italian archer.

Biography
Andrea Parenti won bronze medal with the Italian men's team at the 1996 Summer Olympics, he also participated to two others editions of the Olympic Games (1988 and 1992). He won also a silver medal at the World Archery Championships (1995).

Olympic results

See also
 Italy at the 1996 Summer Olympics – Medalists

References

External links
 
 
 Andrea Parenti at FITARCO 
  

1965 births
Living people
Italian male archers
Olympic archers of Italy
Olympic bronze medalists for Italy
Olympic medalists in archery
Archers at the 1988 Summer Olympics
Archers at the 1992 Summer Olympics
Archers at the 1996 Summer Olympics
World Archery Championships medalists
Medalists at the 1996 Summer Olympics
World Games gold medalists
World Games silver medalists
Competitors at the 1993 World Games
Competitors at the 1997 World Games
Mediterranean Games medalists in archery
Mediterranean Games silver medalists for Italy
Competitors at the 1993 Mediterranean Games
20th-century Italian people